Mikoto Usui is a Japanese born, US educated (MIT Faculty of Economics, PhD program) development economist and international scholar whose life work has centered on multilateral environmental diplomacy, sustainable development governance and science & technology for economic and social development. His recent research and writings have concentrated on the role of the private business sector in sustainable development governance and corporate social responsibility.

Career and background
Usui is a Professor Emeritus at University of Tsukuba, and a professor at the Graduate School of International Business & Cultural Studies, Shukutoku University. Formerly he taught at the Graduate School of Media & Governance at Keio University from 1991 to 1995, as well as at the Graduate School of Management & Public Policy Studies, University of Tsukuba from 1976 to 1991.

Earlier, he served as Director of Research, United Nations Industrial Development Organization (UNIDO) in Vienna from 1986 to 1989; Head of the Industrialization & Technology Program, OECD Development Center, Paris from 1972 to 1976; and Economic Affairs Officer with the Department of Economic & Social Affairs, United Nations, New York from 1960 to 1967. He was also a member of the UN Commission of Science & Technology for Development (UNCSTD) and its predecessor, UNACSTD from 1990 to 1998 as well as participating on the WHO Advisory Committee on Health Research from 1997 to 1999. Source

Recent publications
'The Role of Private Business in International Environmental Governance', Working Paper IAS–CGP Project on International Environmental Governance, 2002
'The Local Agenda 21 Platform for Sustainable Development: an Evaluation of the Recent Experience in Japan and the UK' (with Brendan Barrett), Cross-Cultural Business and Cultural Studies 5 (1), 2001
Theories and Applications of Multilateral Negotiation (Japanese translation of I. William Zartman's International Multilateral Negotiation, Jossey-Bass 1994), Keio University Press, 2000 
'Multilateral Environmental Diplomacy: Science-Politics Interface, Industry-Politics Interface and Issue Linkages in the Emerging System of Multilateral Negotiations', Cross-Cultural Business and Cultural Studies 3 (1), 1999

References

Sustainability advocates
Living people
Year of birth missing (living people)